The Municipal Council of Tirana is the legislative body of Tirana, Albania. As of 2019 it consists of 61 members who serve a 4-year term.
The members of the council are elected in local elections and the last elections were won by the Socialist Party. 
The member of the council elects the Chairman of the council. During the 2019–2021 Albanian political crisis members from the opposition had boycotted the election. Which resulted in a Socialist Party landslide.

Committees
Tirana's City Council consists of 55 members. It has 14 committees listed as follows: 
Finance Committee (7 members)
Juridical Committee (5 members)
Commission of Economy and Social Affairs (5 members)
Education Committee (5 members)
Committee on Health, Veterinary, Environment Protection (5 members)
Public Services Committee (5 members) Territorial Adjustment Committee (5 members)
Foreign Affairs Committee (5 members)
Mandates Commission (5 members)
Commission of Public Order and Civil Defense (5 members)
Housing Committee (5 members)
Commission of Culture, Youth and Sports (5 members)
Audit Commission (5 members)
Assessment Commission figures City (7 members)

Composition of the council
Following the opposition boycott of the Albanian local elections, 2019, the composition of the Council of Tirana is as follows:

References

Politics of Tirana
Local government in Albania
Tirana